The supersoldier (or super soldier)  is a fictional concept soldier, often capable of operating beyond normal human limits or abilities either through genetic modification or cybernetic augmentation.

Overview
Supersoldiers are common in military science fiction literature, films, and video games. Examples include Starship Troopers by Robert A. Heinlein and The Forever War by Joe Haldeman. Supersoldiers are also prevalant in the science fiction universe of Warhammer 40,000 and The Horus Heresy. Critic Mike Ryder has argued that the supersoldiers depicted in these worlds serve as a mirror to present-day issues around sovereignty, military ethics and the law.

Fictional supersoldiers are usually heavily augmented, either through surgical means, eugenics, genetic engineering, cybernetic implants, drugs, brainwashing, traumatic events, an extreme training regimen or other scientific and pseudoscientific means. Occasionally, some instances also use paranormal methods or technology and science of extraterrestrial origin. In entertainment, the creators of such programs are viewed often as mad scientists or stern military personnel depending on the emphasis, as their programs would typically go past ethical boundaries in the pursuit of science or military might.

Cyborg soldier
Some fictional supersoldiers can also be categorized as cyborgs or cybernetic organisms because of augmentations that are intended to enhance human capabilities or to exceed physical human restrictions.

U.S. Army
In the book The Men Who Stare at Goats (2004), Welsh journalist Jon Ronson documented how the U.S. military repeatedly tried and failed to train soldiers in the use of parascientific and pseudoscientific combat techniques during the Cold War, experimenting with New Age tactics and psychic phenomena such as remote viewing, astral projections, "death touch" and mind reading against various Soviet targets.  The book inspired also a war comedy of the same name (2009) directed by Grant Heslov, starring George Clooney.

See also 

 First Earth Battalion
 Future Soldier 2030 Initiative
 Human enhancement
 List of psychoactive drugs used by militaries 
 Project MKUltra
 Superhuman 
 Übermensch
Archetypes in fiction
 Space marine
 Superhero
Fictional examples
 Adeptus Astartes
 Captain America 
 Winter Soldier
 Bloodshot (comics)
 Clone trooper
 Deathstroke
 Doomguy 
 Master Chief (Halo)
 Soldier Boy
 Starship Troopers
 Stormtrooper

References 

Military projects
Research projects
Eugenics in fiction
Military science fiction
Fictional soldiers
Stock characters
Science fiction weapons
Superhero fiction themes
Cyborgs in fiction